Henzen is a surname. Notable people with the surname include:

Andreas Henzen (born 1955), Swiss painter
Charles Henzen (born 1945), Swiss ice hockey player
Wilhelm Henzen (1816–1887), German philologist and epigraphist

See also
Henze

German-language surnames